In a tax system, the tax rate is the ratio (usually expressed as a percentage) at which a business or person is taxed.  There are several methods used to present a tax rate: statutory, average, marginal, and effective.  These rates can also be presented using different definitions applied to a tax base: inclusive and exclusive.

Statutory
A statutory tax rate is the legally imposed rate.  An income tax could have multiple statutory rates for different income levels, where a sales tax may have a flat statutory rate.

The statutory tax rate is expressed as a percentage and will always be higher than the effective tax rate.

Average
An average tax rate is the ratio of the total amount of taxes paid to the total tax base (taxable income or spending), expressed as a percentage.

 Let  be the total tax liability.
 Let  be the total tax base.

In a proportional tax, the tax rate is fixed and the average tax rate equals this tax rate. In case of tax brackets, commonly used for progressive taxes, the average tax rate increases as taxable income increases through tax brackets, asymptoting to the top tax rate. For example, consider a system with three tax brackets, 10%, 20%, and 30%, where the 10% rate applies to income from $1 to $10,000, the 20% rate applies to income from $10,001 to $20,000, and the 30% rate applies to all income above $20,000. Under this system, someone earning $25,000 would pay $1,000 for the first $10,000 of income (10%); $2,000 for the second $10,000 of income (20%); and $1,500 for the last $5,000 of income (30%). In total, they would pay $4,500, or an 18% average tax rate.

Marginal
A marginal tax rate is the tax rate on income set at a higher rate for incomes above a designated higher bracket, which in 2016 in the United States was $415,050. For annual income that was above the cut-off point in that higher bracket, the marginal tax rate in 2016 was 39.6%. For income below the $415,050 cut off, the lower tax rate was 35% or less.

The marginal tax rate on income can be expressed mathematically as follows:

where t is the total tax liability and i is total income, and ∆ refers to a numerical change. In accounting practice, the tax numerator in the above equation usually includes taxes at federal, state, provincial, and municipal levels. Marginal tax rates are applied to income in countries with progressive taxation schemes, with incremental increases in income taxed in progressively higher tax brackets, resulting in the tax burden being distributed amongst those who can most easily afford it.

Marginal taxes are valuable as they allow governments to generate revenue to fund social services in a way that only affects those who will be the least negatively affected.

With a flat tax, by comparison, all income is taxed at the same percentage, regardless of amount. An example is a sales tax where all purchases are taxed equally. A poll tax is a flat tax of a set dollar amount per person.  The marginal tax in these scenarios would be constant (in case of a poll tax—zero), however, these are both forms of regressive taxation and place a higher tax burden on those who are least able to cope with it, and often results in an underfunded government leading to increased deficits.

Effective
The effective tax rate is the percent of their income that an individual or a corporation pays in taxes.

The term is used in financial reporting to measure the total tax paid as a percentage of the company's accounting income, instead of as a percentage of the taxable income. International Accounting Standard 12, define it as income tax expense or benefit for accounting purposes divided by accounting profit. In Generally Accepted Accounting Principles (United States), the term is used in official guidance only with respect to determining income tax expense for interim (e.g. quarterly) periods by multiplying accounting income by an "estimated annual effective tax rate", the definition of which rate varies depending on the reporting entity's circumstances.

In U.S. income tax law, the term can be used in relation to determining whether a foreign income tax on specific types of income exceeds a certain percentage of U.S. tax that would apply on such income if U.S. tax had been applicable to the income.

Inclusive and exclusive
 Tax rates can be presented differently due to differing definitions of tax base, which can make comparisons between tax systems confusing.

Some tax systems include the taxes owed in the tax base (tax-inclusive, Before Tax), while other tax systems do not include taxes owed as part of the base (tax-exclusive, After Tax). In the United States, sales taxes are usually quoted exclusively and income taxes are quoted inclusively. The majority of Europe, value added tax (VAT) countries, include the tax amount when quoting merchandise prices, including Goods and Services Tax (GST) countries, such as Australia and New Zealand. However, those countries still define their tax rates on a tax exclusive basis.

For direct rate comparisons between exclusive and inclusive taxes, one rate must be manipulated to look like the other. When a tax system imposes taxes primarily on income, the tax base is a household's pre-tax income. The appropriate income tax rate is applied to the tax base to calculate taxes owed. Under this formula, taxes to be paid are included in the base on which the tax rate is imposed. If an individual's gross income is $100 and income tax rate is 20%, taxes owed equals $20.

The income tax is taken "off the top", so the individual is left with $80 in after-tax money. Some tax laws impose taxes on a tax base equal to the pre-tax portion of a good's price. Unlike the income tax example above, these taxes do not include actual taxes owed as part of the base. A good priced at $80 with a 25% exclusive sales tax rate yields $20 in taxes owed. Since the sales tax is added "on the top", the individual pays $20 of tax on $80 of pre-tax goods for a total cost of $100. In either case, the tax base of $100 can be treated as two parts—$80 of after-tax spending money and $20 of taxes owed. A 25% exclusive tax rate approximates a 20% inclusive tax rate after adjustment. By including taxes owed in the tax base, an exclusive tax rate can be directly compared to an inclusive tax rate.

Inclusive income tax rate comparison to an exclusive sales tax rate:
 Let  be the inclusive tax rate (like an income tax). For a 20% rate, then 
 Let  be the exclusive rate (like a sales tax).
 Let  be the total price of the good (including the tax).

The revenue that would go to the government:

The revenue remaining for the seller of the good:

To convert the inclusive rate to the exclusive rate, divide the money going to the government by the money the company nets:

Therefore, to convert any inclusive tax rate to an exclusive tax rate, divide the inclusive rate by 1 minus that rate.
 15% inclusive = 18% exclusive
 20% inclusive = 25% exclusive
 25% inclusive = 33% exclusive
 33% inclusive = 50% exclusive
 50% inclusive = 100% exclusive

See also
 Capital flight
 List of countries by tax rates
 List of countries by tax revenue as percentage of GDP
 Progressive tax
 Proportional tax
 Regressive tax
 Tax exporting
 Tax incidence
 Tax rates of Europe

References

External links 

Rates
Tax incidence
Tax terms